Mizri is a village near Sibi Balochistan Pakistan.

References

See also
 Sibi District
 Mehergarh
 Sibi
 Bibi Nani
 khajjak
 Marghazani
 Kurak
 Talli

Populated places in Sibi District